John James Conyers Jr. (May 16, 1929October 27, 2019) was an American politician of the Democratic Party who served as a U.S. representative from Michigan from 1965 to 2017. The districts he represented always included part of western Detroit. During his final three terms, his district included many of Detroit's western suburbs, as well as a large portion of the Downriver area.

Conyers served more than fifty years in Congress, becoming the sixth-longest serving member of Congress in U.S. history; he was the longest-serving African American member of Congress. Conyers was the Dean of the House of Representatives from 2015 to 2017, by virtue of him being the longest-serving member of Congress at the time. By the end of his last term, he was the last remaining member of Congress who had served since the presidency of Lyndon B. Johnson.

After serving in the Korean War, Conyers became active in the civil rights movement. He also served as an aide to Congressman John Dingell before winning election to the House in 1964. He co-founded the Congressional Black Caucus in 1969 and established a reputation as one of the most liberal members of Congress. Conyers joined the Congressional Progressive Caucus after it was founded in 1991. Conyers supported creation of a single-payer healthcare system and sponsored the United States National Health Care Act. He also sponsored a bill to establish Martin Luther King Jr. Day as a federal holiday, and was the first congressperson to introduce legislation in support of reparations for the descendants of African-American slavery.

Conyers ran for Mayor of Detroit in 1989 and 1993, but he was defeated in the primary each time.

Conyers served as the ranking Democratic member on the House Committee on the Judiciary from 1995 to 2007 and again from 2011 to 2017. He served as chairman of that committee from 2007 to 2011 and as Chairman of the House Oversight Committee from 1989 to 1995. In the wake of allegations that he had sexually harassed female staff members and secretly used taxpayer money to settle a harassment claim, Conyers announced his resignation from Congress on December 5, 2017.

Early life, education, and early career 

Conyers was born and raised in Detroit, the son of Lucille Janice (Simpson) and John James Conyers, a labor leader. Among his siblings was younger brother William Conyers. After graduating from Northwestern High School, Conyers served in the Michigan National Guard from 1948 to 1950; the U.S. Army from 1950 to 1954; and the U.S. Army Reserves from 1954 to 1957. Conyers served for a year in Korea during the Korean War as an officer in the U.S. Army Corps of Engineers and was awarded combat and merit citations.

After his active military service, Conyers pursued a college education. He earned both his BA (1957) and LL.B. (1958) degrees from Wayne State University. After he was admitted to the bar, he worked on the staff of Congressman John Dingell. He also served as counsel to several Detroit-area labor union locals. From 1961 to 1963, he was a referee for Michigan's workmen's compensation department.

Conyers became one of the leaders of the civil rights movement. He was present in Selma, Alabama, on October 7, 1963, for the voter registration drive known as Freedom Day.

U.S. House of Representatives

Elections 

In 1964, Conyers ran for an open seat in what was then the 1st District, and defeated Republican Robert Blackwell with 84% of the vote. He was reelected 13 times with even larger margins. After the 1990 United States Census, Michigan lost a congressional district, and there was redistricting. Conyers's district was renumbered as the 14th district.

In 1992, Conyers won re-election to his 15th term in his new district, which included western suburbs of Detroit, with 82% of the vote against Republican nominee John Gordon. He won re-election another nine times after that. His worst re-election performance was in 2010, when he got 77% of the vote against Republican nominee Don Ukrainec. In 2013, his district was renamed as the 13th district.

In total, Conyers won re-election twenty-five times and was serving in his twenty-sixth term. He was the dean of the House as longest-serving current member, the third longest-serving member of the House in history, and the sixth longest-serving member of Congress in history. He was the second-longest serving member of either house of Congress in Michigan's history, trailing only his former boss, Dingell. He was also the last member of the large Democratic freshman class of 1964 who was still serving in the House.

In May 2014, Wayne County Clerk Cathy Garrett determined that Conyers had not submitted enough valid nominating petition signatures to appear on the August 2014 Primary Election ballot. Two of his workers circulating petitions were not themselves registered voters at the time, which was required under Michigan law. But on May 23, Federal District Judge Matthew Leitman issued an injunction placing Conyers back on the ballot, ruling that the requirement that circulators be registered voters was similar to an Ohio law which had been found unconstitutional in 2008 by a Federal appeals court. The Michigan Secretary of State's office subsequently announced they would not appeal the ruling.

Tenure 

Conyers was one of the 13 founding members of the Congressional Black Caucus (CBC) and was considered the Dean of that group. Formed in 1969, the CBC was founded to strengthen African-American lawmakers' ability to address the legislative concerns of Black and minority citizens. He served longer in Congress than any other African American. In 1971, he was one of the original members of Nixon's Enemies List.

In 1965, Conyers won a seat as a freshman on the influential Judiciary Committee, which was then chaired by Democratic Congressman Emanuel Celler of New York. The assignment was considered an elite one, as Judiciary ranked behind only Ways and Means and Appropriations in terms of the number of Members who sought assignment there.

According to the National Journal, Conyers has been considered, with Pete Stark, John Lewis, Jim McDermott, and Barbara Lee, to be one of the most liberal members of Congress for many years. Rosa Parks, known for her prominent role in the Montgomery, Alabama bus boycott, moved to Detroit and served on Conyers's staff between 1965 and 1988.

Conyers was known to have opposed regulation of online gambling. He opposed the Unlawful Internet Gambling Enforcement Act of 2006. After the assassination of Martin Luther King Jr. in 1968, Conyers introduced the first bill in Congress to make King's birthday a federal holiday. He continued to propose legislation to establish the federal holiday in every session of Congress from 1968 to 1983, when Martin Luther King Jr. Day was finally signed into law by President Ronald Reagan.

In 1983 he joined with 7 other Congressional Representatives to sponsor a resolution to impeach Ronald Reagan over his sudden and unexpected invasion of Grenada.

Conyers introduced the "Commission to Study Reparation Proposals for African Americans Act" in January 1989. He re-introduced this bill each congressional term. It calls for establishing a commission to research the history of slavery in the United States and its effects on current society, which is to recommend ways to remedy this injustice against African Americans. The current version was introduced and referred to committee on January 3, 2013. Conyers first introduced the proposed resolution in 1989, and has stated his intention to annually propose this act until it is approved and passed. Since 1997, the bill has been designated "H.R. 40", most recently, alluding to the promise of "forty acres and a mule". If passed, the commission would explore the longstanding effects of slavery on today's society, politics, and economy.

Nixon and Watergate 

Conyers was critical of President Richard Nixon during his tenure. He was listed as number 13 on President Nixon's enemies list during the president's 1969–74 presidential tenure. The president's Chief Counsel described him as "coming on fast", and said he was "emerging" as a "black anti-Nixon spokesman". Conyers, who voted to impeach Nixon in July 1974, wrote at the time,

National Health Care Act 

Conyers submitted the United States National Health Care Act (Expanded and Improved Medicare for All Act) (H.R. 676); as of 2015, it had 49 cosponsors. He introduced it with 25 cosponsors, in 2003, and reintroduced it each session since then. The act calls for the creation of a universal single-payer health care system in the United States, in which the government would provide every resident health care free of charge. To eliminate disparate treatment between richer and poorer Americans, the Act would prohibit private insurers from covering any treatment or procedure already covered by the Act.

House impeachment manager in Hastings trial
Conyers was one of the House impeachment managers who prosecuted the in case the impeachment trial of Judge Alcee Hastings. Hastings was found guilty by the United States Senate and removed from his federal judgeship.

Downing Street memo 

On May 5, 2005, Conyers and 88 other members of Congress wrote an open letter to the White House inquiring about the Downing Street memo. This was a leaked memorandum that revealed an apparent secret agreement between the U.S. and British governments to invade Iraq in 2002. The Times, among the first to publish news of the leak, wrote that the discovered documented revealed the intentions of Bush and Blair to invade Iraq, along with revealing that the two had "discussed creating pretextual justifications for doing so."

The memo story broke in the United Kingdom, but did not receive much coverage in the United States. Conyers said: "This should not be allowed to fall down the memory hole during wall-to-wall coverage of the Michael Jackson trial and a runaway bride." Conyers and others reportedly considered sending a congressional investigation delegation to London.

What Went Wrong in Ohio 

In May 2005, Conyers released What Went Wrong in Ohio: The Conyers Report On The 2004 Presidential Election. This dealt with the voting irregularities in the state of Ohio during the 2004 U.S. Presidential Election. The evidence offered consists of statistical abnormalities in the differences between exit poll results and actual votes registered at those locations. The book also discusses reports of faulty electronic voting machines and the lack of credibility of those machines used to tally votes.

Conyers was one of 31 members of the House who voted not to count the 20 electoral votes from Ohio in the 2004 presidential election. The state was won by Republican President George Bush by 118,457 votes.

Constitution in Crisis 

On August 4, 2006, Conyers released his report, The Constitution in Crisis: The Downing Street Minutes and Deception, Manipulation, Torture, Retributions and Cover-ups in the Iraq War, an edited collection of information intended to serve as evidence that the Bush Administration altered intelligence to justify the 2003 invasion of Iraq.

The Constitution in Crisis examines much of the evidence presented by the Bush Administration prior to the invasion and questions the credibility of their sources of intelligence. In addition, the document investigates conditions that led to the torture scandal at Abu Ghraib prison in Iraq, as well as further evidence of torture having been committed but not made known to the public. Finally, the document reports on a series of "smear tactics" purportedly used by the administration in dealing with its political adversaries. The document calls for the censure of President George W. Bush and Vice President Dick Cheney. Conyers refused to back impeachment proceedings, however.

On anti-Muslim intolerance 

Conyers proposed House Resolution 288, which condemns "religious intolerance" and emphasizes Islam as needing special protection from acts of violence and intolerance. It states that "it should never be official policy of the United States Government to disparage the Quran, Islam, or any religion in any way, shape, or form," and "calls upon local, State, and Federal authorities to work to prevent bias-motivated crimes and acts against all individuals, including those of the Islamic faith." The bill was referred to the House subcommittee on the Constitution in June 2005.

In 2005, Conyers introduced House Resolution 160, a house resolution that would have condemned the conduct of Narendra Modi, then the chief minister of the State of Gujarat in India. The resolution was cosponsored by Republican Representative Joseph R. Pitts (Republican of Pennsylvania). The resolution's title was: "Condemning the conduct of Chief Minister Narendra Modi for his actions to incite religious persecution and urging the United States to condemn all violations of religious freedom in India." The resolution cited a 2004 United States Commission on International Religious Freedom report on Modi stating that he was "widely accused of being reluctant to bring the perpetrators of the killings of Muslims and non-Hindus to justice". (See 2002 Gujarat riots.) The resolution was not adopted.

Conyers v. Bush 

In April 2006 Conyers, together with ten other senior congressmen, filed an action in the U.S. District Court in the Eastern District of Michigan, Southern Division, challenging the constitutionality of the Deficit Reduction Act of 2005. The complaint alleged the bill was not afforded due consideration by the United States Congress before being signed by the President. The action was subsequently dismissed on grounds of lack of standing.

Ethics controversy 

In April 2006, the FBI and the U.S. Attorney's office sent independent letters to the House Ethics Committee, saying two former aides of Conyers had alleged that Conyers used his staff to work on several local and state campaigns of other politiciansincluding his wifefor the Detroit City Council. (She won a seat in 2005.) He also forced them to baby-sit and chauffeur his children.

In late December 2006, Conyers "accepted responsibility" for violating House rules. A statement issued December 29, 2006, by the House Ethics Committee chairman Doc Hastings and Ranking Minority Member Howard Berman, said Conyers acknowledged what he characterized as a "lack of clarity" in his communications with staff members regarding their official duties and responsibilities, and accepted responsibility for his actions.

In deciding to drop the matter, Hastings and Berman said:

Copyright bill 

Conyers repeatedly introduced the Fair Copyright in Research Works Act, a bill that would overturn the NIH Public Access Policy, an open-access mandate of the National Institutes of Health. Conyers's bill would forbid the government from mandating that federally funded research be made freely available to the public. The legislation was supported by the publishing industry, and opposed by groups such as the Electronic Frontier Foundation. Writers Lawrence Lessig and Michael Eisen accused Conyers of being influenced by publishing houses, who have contributed significant money to his campaigns.

House Report on George W. Bush presidency and proposed inquiry 

On January 13, 2009, the House Committee on the Judiciary, led by Conyers, released Reining in the Imperial Presidency: Lessons and Recommendations Relating to the Presidency of George W. Bush, a 486-page report detailing alleged abuses of power that occurred during the Bush administration, and a comprehensive set of recommendations to prevent recurrence. Conyers introduced a bill to set up a "truth commission" panel to investigate alleged policy abuses of the Bush administration.

Bill reading controversy 

In late July 2009, Conyers, commenting on the healthcare debate in the House, stated: "I love these members, they get up and say, 'Read the bill'... What good is reading the bill if it's a thousand pages and you don't have two days and two lawyers to find out what it means after you read the bill?" His remark brought criticism from government transparency advocates such as the Sunlight Foundation, which referred to readthebill.org in response.

Bribery conviction of wife 

On June 16, 2009, the United States Attorney's Office said two Synagro Technologies representatives had named Monica Conyers as the recipient of bribes from the company totaling more than $6,000, paid to influence passage of a contract with the City of Detroit. The information was gathered during an FBI investigation into political corruption in the city.

She was given a pre-indictment letter, and offered a plea bargain deal in the case. On June 26, 2009, she was charged with conspiring to commit bribery. She pleaded guilty. On March 10, 2010, she was sentenced to 37 months in prison, and also received two years of supervised probation. She served slightly more than 27 months at the Alderson Federal Prison Camp. After supervised release, she was fully released from federal custody officially on May 16, 2013.

Response to accusations regarding American Muslim spies 

In October, Conyers responded to allegations from four Republican Congress Members, in the wake of the launch of the book Muslim Mafia, that the Council on American-Islamic Relations (CAIR) sought to plant Muslim "spies" in Capitol Hill. He strongly opposed the accusations, saying:

WikiLeaks 

At a December 16, 2010, hearing of the House Judiciary Committee on the subject of "the Espionage Act and the Legal and Constitutional Issues Raised by WikiLeaks", Conyers "argue[d] strongly against prosecuting WikiLeaks in hasteor at all." He strongly defended the whistleblowing organization, saying:

Conyers's statement was "in marked contrast to the repeated calls from other members of Congress and Obama administration officials to prosecute WikiLeaks head Julian Assange immediately."

Criticism of American foreign policy 

Conyers and his Republican colleague Ted Yoho offered bipartisan amendments to block the U.S. military training of Ukraine's Azov Battalion of the Ukrainian National Guard. Some members of the battalion are openly white supremacists. Conyers stated, "If there's one simple lesson we can take away from U.S. involvement in conflicts overseas, it's this: Beware of unintended consequences. As was made vividly clear with U.S. involvement in Afghanistan during the Soviet invasion decades ago, overzealous military assistance or the hyper-weaponization of conflicts can have destabilizing consequences and ultimately undercut our own national interests."

Conyers has also voiced concerns about sending anti-aircraft missiles to Syrian rebels.

Sexual harassment allegations and resignation 

In 2015, a former employee of Conyers alleged that he had sexually harassed her and dismissed her. She filed an affidavit with the Congressional Office of Compliance. Conyers had entered into a confidentiality agreement with the former employee and had paid her a $27,000 settlement from his publicly funded office budget in 2015. BuzzFeed reported on the allegations and settlement on November 20, 2017; Buzzfeed also reported allegations that Conyers "repeatedly made sexual advances to female staff," caressed female staffers' hands in a sexual manner, and rubbed their backs and legs in public.

On November 21, 2017, Conyers issued a statement in which he said, "In our country, we strive to honor this fundamental principle that all are entitled to due process. In this case, I expressly and vehemently denied the allegations made against me, and continue to do so. My office resolved the allegationswith an express denial of liabilityin order to save all involved from the rigors of protracted litigation."

Also on November 21, 2017, the House Ethics Committee launched an investigation into multiple sexual harassment allegations against Conyers.

On November 22, 2017, The Washington Post reported that Melanie Sloan, founder of Citizens for Responsibility and Ethics in Washington (CREW), publicly accused Conyers of having harassed and verbally abused her during her tenure working for the House Judiciary Committee. On one occasion, Sloan alleged that Conyers had summoned to his office, where she found him sitting in his underwear; she quickly departed.

Later in November 2017, there were reports that another woman accused Conyers of sexual harassment. House Minority Leader Nancy Pelosi, who had initially stated that Conyers was an "icon" and had done a great deal to protect women, called upon Conyers to resign. She said the allegations against him were "very credible".

On December 5, 2017, Conyers resigned his House seat because of his mounting sexual scandals. The announcement came the day after another former staffer released an affidavit accusing Conyers of sexual harassment. The same day, an article by The Washington Post published allegations by Courtney Morse that Conyers had threatened her with a similar fate to that of Chandra Levy, a staffer found murdered in a park in Washington, DC. She said that after she rejected his advances, he "said he had insider information on the case. I don't know if he meant it to be threatening, but I took it that way."

At a time when the #MeToo movement was pushing for action against men who harassed women, some media and supporters in Detroit believed Conyers had been unfairly treated. He was reported as the "first sitting politician to be ousted from office in the wake of the #MeToo movement."

Caucus memberships 

 Founding Member and Dean of the Congressional Black Caucus
 American Sikh Congressional Caucus
 Congressional Progressive Caucus
 United States Congressional International Conservation Caucus
 Out of Afghanistan Caucus (Co-chair)
 Congressional Full Employment Caucus
 Congressional Arts Caucus
 Afterschool Caucuses
 Congressional NextGen 9-1-1 Caucus

Political positions 

According to The New Republic, Conyers was a member of the Democratic Socialists of America in 1983.

Conyers supported legislation aimed at strengthening the U.S. civil justice system. In March 2016, Rep. Conyers and Representative Hank Johnson introduced legislation to protect consumers access to civil courts, titled the "Restoring Statutory Rights Act." This legislation would "ensure that the state, federal, and constitutional rights of Americans are enforceable" and consumers aren't forced into secretive private arbitration hearings.

Detroit mayoral campaigns 

While serving in the U.S. House, Conyers made two unsuccessful runs for mayor of Detroit: one in 1989 against incumbent Coleman Young and again in 1993.

1989 

Incumbent Democratic Mayor Coleman Young decided to run for a fifth term, despite growing unpopularity and the declining economy of Detroit. In the September primary, Young won with 51% of the vote. Accountant Tom Barrow qualified for the November run-off by having 24%, and Conyers received 18% of the vote. Despite the difficulties of the city, Young defeated Barrow in the run-off with 56% of the vote.

1993 

In June 1993, incumbent Democratic Mayor Coleman Young decided to retire instead of seeking a sixth term, citing his age and health. Many observers believed he had decided not to test his growing unpopularity. In a Detroit News poll in February, 81% said Young should retire. Conyers was one of the 23 candidates who qualified for ballot access.

Dennis Archer was the front runner in the mayoral campaign from the beginning. The 51-year-old former State Supreme Court Justice raised over $1.6million to finance his campaign. He won the September primary with 54% of the vote. Conyers came in fourth place. Archer won the November election.

Electoral history

Personal life and death 

Conyers married Monica Esters, a teacher in Detroit, in 1990. She was 25 and he was 61; they had two sons together, John James III and Carl Edward Conyers. She later served as a vice administrator of the public schools, and in 2005 was elected to the Detroit City Council. In September 2015, Monica Conyers filed for divorce, citing a "breakdown of the marriage". However, they reconciled in late 2016.

Conyers's grandnephew, Ian Conyers, was elected to the Michigan Senate in 2016. He generated controversy by telling of Conyers's planned retirement in interviews before the Congressman announced it himself, and claiming his great-uncle's endorsement. Following the Congressman's resignation, Ian Conyers announced that he would run in the special election for the Congressman's seat. The Congressman instead endorsed his son, John Conyers III, as his successor. John Conyers III chose not to run. Ian Conyers was defeated in the Democratic primary by Rashida Tlaib.

Conyers died at his home in Detroit on October 27, 2019, at the age of 90. His funeral was held on November4 at Detroit's Greater Grace Temple.

Representation in other media 
 Conyers frequently posted at Daily Kos and Democratic Underground. Beginning May 2005, he had been a contributing blogger at The Huffington Post and on his own blog.
 John Conyers appeared in Michael Moore's documentary Fahrenheit 9/11, discussing the aftermath of the September 11 attacks. He said many members of Congress "don't read most of the bills", as they are very lengthy. They rely on staff to study them in detail.

Honors and awards 

In 2007, he was awarded the Spingarn Medal from the NAACP.

See also 
 History of African Americans in Detroit
 List of African-American United States representatives
 List of Democratic Socialists of America who have held office in the United States
 PRO-IP Act
 United States National Health Care Act

Notes and references

External links 

 
 CD14 at Michigan Liberal
 John Conyers's oral history video excerpts at The National Visionary Leadership Project
 John Conyers Jr for Congress
 Global Family Day movement co-founded by John Conyers and Linda Grover
 
 
Articles
 It's time for Karl Rove to go: The president needs to ask for a special prosecutor in the Valerie Plame case Congressman John Conyers Jr., Salon.com (October 15, 2003)
 Preserving Democracy: What Went Wrong in Ohio: Status Report of the House Judiciary Committee Democratic Staff (prepared at the request of Congressman John Conyers, January 5, 2005)
 Open letter to George W. Bush, re: Downing Street Memo (originally signed by 89 U.S. Congress members), John Conyers, et al. (May 5, 2005)
 Bush asked to explain UK war memo CNN (May 12, 2005)
 The Downing Street Memo John Conyers (May 27, 2005)
 Congressman John Conyers Talks About Bush Lying America Into War and His Campaign to Hold Bush Accountable: The Downing Street Memo and More (John Conyers interview), BuzzFlash (June 9, 2005)
 The Constitution in Crisis; The Downing Street Minutes and Deception, Manipulation, Torture, Retribution, and Coverups in the Iraq War (Investigative Status Report of the House Judiciary Committee Democratic Staff, December 2005)
 A Motion for Censure Congressman John Conyers Jr., The Nation (December 22, 2005)
 Q & A with Conyers Guernica Magazine, May 22, 2006
 House chair warns White House to comply with subpoenas, November 5, 2007

|-

|-

|-

|-

|-

|-

|-

1929 births
2019 deaths
21st-century American politicians
Activists for African-American civil rights
African-American members of the United States House of Representatives
African-American United States Army personnel
African-American people in Michigan politics
United States Army personnel of the Korean War
Baptists from Michigan
Burials in Michigan
Deans of the United States House of Representatives
Democratic Party members of the United States House of Representatives from Michigan
HuffPost writers and columnists
Lawyers from Detroit
Democratic Socialists of America politicians from Michigan
Military personnel from Michigan
Nixon's Enemies List
People from Highland Park, Michigan
Politicians from Detroit
Spingarn Medal winners
United States Army officers
Wayne State University Law School alumni
Northwestern High School (Michigan) alumni
American reparationists
African Americans in the Korean War